Kristaps Neretnieks (born 2 August 1989) is a Latvian show jumping competitor. He represented Latvia at the 2020 Summer Olympics in Tokyo 2021, finishing 23rd in individual jumping.

References

External links
 FEI profile 

 

1989 births
Living people
Latvian male equestrians
Equestrians at the 2020 Summer Olympics
Olympic equestrians of Latvia
Show jumping riders
Sportspeople from Riga
20th-century Latvian people
21st-century Latvian people